The First Bible of Charles the Bald (BNF Lat. 1), also known as the Vivian Bible, is a Carolingian-era Bible commissioned by Count Vivian of Tours in 845, the lay abbot of Saint-Martin de Tours, and presented to Charles the Bald in 846 on a visit to the church, as shown in the presentation miniature at the end of the book. It is 495 mm by 345 mm and has 423 vellum folia. It is now in the Bibliothèque nationale de France in Paris.

It is also thought to be the third illuminated Bible to have been made at Tours following the Bamberg Bible (Staatsbibliothek Bamberg Msc. Bibl. 1) and Moutier-Grandval Bible (British Library Add MS 10546).

References

Further reading

 Walther, Ingo F. and Norbert Wolf. Codices Illustres: The world's most famous illuminated manuscripts, 400 to 1600. Köln, TASCHEN, 2005.

Illuminated biblical manuscripts
9th-century biblical manuscripts
Bibliothèque nationale de France collections
Carolingian illuminated manuscripts